The Links is an American invitation-only social and service organization of prominent Black women in the United States. Founded in 1946, it is the largest nationwide organization of Black women in the USA. Members include multiple prominent women, including Kamala Harris, Marian Wright Edelman, and the late Betty Shabazz.

As of 2021, there were 16,000 members in nearly 300 chapters. The organization was founded in Philadelphia, but since 2022, it is headquartered in Washington, D.C.

History 
The Links, Incorporated, a nonprofit corporation, was founded in 1946 in Philadelphia by seven prominent Black women. Sarah Strickland Scott and Margaret Roselle Hawkins recruited Frances Atkinson, Katie Green, Marion Minton, Lillian Stanford, Myrtle Manigault Stratton, Lillian Wall, and Dorothy Wright. All of the women were members of prominent Black professional families of Philadelphia; six were the wives of physicians and the seventh the wife of a bank president. All had bachelor's or master's degrees from elite schools and had been active in other elite Black social organizations such as Jack and Jill and Alpha Kappa Alpha and other prominent organizations such as the NAACP, the League of Women Voters, and the Philadelphia Grand Opera Company. Most were members of St. Thomas Episcopal Church. The group's name was suggested by Wall as a symbol of enduring friendship.

Other cities soon created chapters. By 1949, there were ten chapters and by 1952, there were 56 chapters. As of 2008 there were approximately 12,000 members in 273 chapters in 42 states Greater Detroit had four chapters in 2021.

Over the decades the group transformed itself from "a group of women married to influential men to a group of women who became influential themselves", according to one member; the evolution caused "clear conflict between the old guard and the new guard", according to another.

Organization 
As of 2021, there were 16,000 members in 292 chapters. As of 1999 each chapter membership was limited to no more than 55 women. The headquarters has been located in Washington, D.C., since at least 1985.

Leadership 
As of 2022, the organization has had fourteen national presidents.

 Sarah Strickland Scott, 1949–1953
 Margaret Rosell Hawkins, 1953–1957
 Pauline Weeden Maloney, 1957–1961
 Vivian J. Beamon, 1962–1970
 Helen Gray Edmonds, 1970–1974
 Pauline Ellison, 1974–1978
 Julia Brogdon Purnell, 1978–1982
 Regina Jollivette Frazier, 1986–1990
 Marion Elizabeth Schultz Sutherland, 1990–1994
 Patricia Russell-McCloud, 1994–1998
 Barbara Dixon Simpkins, 1998–2002
 Gladys Gary Vaughn, 2002–2006
 Gwendolyn B. Lee, 2006–2010
 Margot James Copeland, 2010–2014
 Glenda Newell-Harris, 2014–2018
 Kimberly Jefferies Leonard, 2018–2022

Exclusivity 
Women interested in joining any of the local chapters must be nominated by a current member; if a chapter has 55 members, no more may be accepted until one leaves. Admission is "extremely competitive", according to Lawrence Otis Graham, author of Our Kind of People (1999). One member of a Washington D.C. chapter describes having spent "twelve years of strategizing, party-giving, and brownnosing to get into this group." Most women do not get into Links until they are in their 40s or older, and most remain members until they die.

Links has been criticized for its exclusivity; one member noted that while a woman could be nominated by any other member, for practical intents those admitted are "usually those who know at least half of the chapter's membership". Social, professional, or economic prominence within a city's Black community also may help get a candidate admitted, as members with such backgrounds help add to the chapter's prestige.

Work 
The organization requires each member to accumulate many volunteer hours. The organization raises funds for a variety of charities and causes such as the United Negro College Fund and the NAACP Legal Defense Fund. The national core focuses include education, health, youth services, the arts, domestic legislation, and international welfare.

Chapters typically also hold multiple social events for a city's Black elites, such as debutante cotillions, fashion shows, gala fundraisers, balls, luncheons, and formal parties.

Importance 
According to Graham, The Links is the "most elite organization" for prominent American Black women, and is both the largest and the most influential. Membership in the organization, he writes, signals to other prominent Blacks that "your social background, lifestyle, physical appearance, and family's academic and professional accomplishments passed muster".

Los Angeles PBS station KCET called The Links "the most prominent" of the Black women's clubs. Rolling Stone called it "one of the most influential and prestigious".

John Lewis called The Links a “distinguished organization of outstanding community service and influence”.

Notable members 

Members include philanthropists, college presidents, politicians, activists, judges, doctors, bankers, lawyers, executives, educators, and the wives of well-known public figures. Notable members include:

 Hannah Atkins 
 Etta Moten Barnett
 Joyce Beatty
 Anita Lyons Bond
 Keisha Lance Bottoms
 Johnnetta Cole
 Val Demings
 Marian Wright Edelman
 Helen Gray Edmonds
 Amanda Edwards
 Kamala Harris
 Mary Gibson Hundley
 Sheila Jackson Lee
 Eddie Bernice Johnson
 Elaine Jones
 Ann Jordan
 Pauline Weeden Maloney
 Annette March-Grier
 Eugenia L. Mobley
 Sharon Pratt
 Ayanna Pressley
 Hazel O'Leary
 Danielle Outlaw
 Jo Ann Robinson
 Angela Rye
 Tami Sawyer
 Betty Shabazz
 Marian Spencer 
 Evelyn Reid Syphax
 Pat Timmons-Goodson
 Yvonne Walker-Taylor
 Susie Ione Brown Waxwood
 Frederica Wilson

References 

African-American culture
Upper class culture in the United States
1946 establishments in Pennsylvania
Women's clubs in the United States
Non-profit organizations based in Washington, D.C.
Organizations established in 1946
African-American upper class
African-American women's organizations